The 1906 Oregon gubernatorial election took place on June 4, 1906 to elect the governor of the U.S. state of Oregon. The election matched Republican James Withycombe against incumbent Democrat George Earle Chamberlain.

Results

References

Gubernatorial
1906
Oregon
November 1906 events